Alfred Dreyfus (also  , ; 9 October 1859 – 12 July 1935) was a French artillery officer of Jewish ancestry from Alsace whose trial and conviction in 1894 on charges of treason became one of the most polarizing political dramas in modern French history. The incident has gone down in history as the Dreyfus affair, the reverberations from which were felt throughout Europe. It ultimately ended with Dreyfus's complete exoneration.

Early life, family and education 
Born in Mulhouse, Alsace in 1859, Dreyfus was the youngest of nine children born to Raphaël and Jeannette Dreyfus (née Libmann).  Raphaël Dreyfus was a prosperous, self-made Jewish textile manufacturer who had started as a peddler. Alfred was 10 years old when the Franco-Prussian War broke out in the summer of 1870, and following the annexation of Alsace-Lorraine by Germany after the war, he and his family moved to Basel, Switzerland, where he attended high school. The family later relocated to Paris.

Early career
The childhood experience of seeing his family uprooted by the war with Germany prompted Dreyfus to decide on a career in the military. Following his 18th birthday in October 1877, he enrolled in the elite École Polytechnique military school in Paris, where he received military training and an education in the sciences. In 1880, he graduated and was commissioned as a sub-lieutenant in the French army. From 1880 to 1882, he attended the artillery school at Fontainebleau to receive more specialized training as an artillery officer. On graduation he was assigned to the 31st Artillery Regiment, which was in garrison at Le Mans. Dreyfus was subsequently transferred to a mounted artillery battery attached to the First Cavalry Division (Paris), and promoted to lieutenant in 1885.  In 1889, he was made adjutant to the director of the Établissement de Bourges, a government arsenal, and promoted to captain.

On 18 April 1891, the 31-year-old Dreyfus married 20-year-old Lucie Eugénie Hadamard (1870–1945). They had two children, Pierre (1891–1946) and Jeanne (1893–1981). Three days after the wedding, Dreyfus learned that he had been admitted to the École Supérieure de Guerre or War College. Two years later, he graduated ninth in his class with honorable mention and was immediately designated as a trainee in the French Army's General Staff headquarters, where he would be the only Jewish officer. His father Raphaël died on 13 December 1893.

At the War College examination in 1892, his friends had expected him to do well. However, one of the members of the panel, General Bonnefond, felt that "Jews were not desired" on the staff, and gave Dreyfus poor marks for cote d'amour (French slang: attraction; translatable as likability). Bonnefond's assessment lowered Dreyfus's overall grade; he did the same to another Jewish candidate, Lieutenant Picard. Learning of this injustice, the two officers lodged a protest with the director of the school, General Lebelin de Dionne, who expressed his regret for what had occurred, but said he was powerless to take any steps in the matter. The protest would later count against Dreyfus. The French army of the period was relatively open to entry and advancement by talent, with an estimated 300 Jewish officers, of whom ten were generals. However, within the Fourth Bureau of the General Staff, General Bonnefond's prejudices appear to have been shared by some of the new trainee's superiors. The personal assessments received by Dreyfus during 1893/94 acknowledged his high intelligence, but were critical of aspects of his personality.

The Dreyfus affair 

A torn-up handwritten note, referred to throughout the affair as the bordereau, was found by a French housekeeper in a wastebasket at the German Embassy. The bordereau described a minor French military secret, and had obviously been written by a spy in the French military.

In 1894, this made the French Army's counter-intelligence section, led by Lieutenant Colonel Jean Sandherr, aware that information regarding new artillery parts was being passed to Maximilian von Schwartzkoppen, the German military attache in Paris, by a highly placed spy most likely on the General Staff. Suspicion quickly fell upon Dreyfus, who was arrested for treason on 15 October 1894. On 5 January 1895, Dreyfus was summarily convicted in a secret court martial, publicly stripped of his army rank, and sentenced to life imprisonment on Devil's Island in French Guiana. Following French military custom of the time, Dreyfus was formally degraded (cashiered) by having the rank insignia, buttons and braid cut from his uniform and his sword broken, all in the courtyard of the École Militaire before silent ranks of soldiers, while a large crowd of onlookers shouted abuse from behind railings. Dreyfus cried out: "I swear that I am innocent. I remain worthy of serving in the Army. Long live France! Long live the Army!"

In August 1896, the new chief of French military intelligence, Lieutenant Colonel Georges Picquart, reported to his superiors that he had found  evidence to the effect that the real traitor was the Major Ferdinand Walsin Esterhazy. Picquart was silenced by being transferred to command a tirailleur regiment based in Sousse, Tunisia, in November 1896. When reports of an army cover-up and Dreyfus's possible innocence were leaked to the press, a heated debate ensued about anti-Semitism and France's identity as a Catholic nation or a republic founded on equal rights for all citizens. Esterhazy was found not guilty by a secret court martial, before fleeing secretly to England and shaving off his moustache. Rachel Beer, editor of The Observer and the Sunday Times, English newspapers, knew that Esterhazy was in London because The Observers Paris correspondent had made a connection with him; she interviewed him twice, and he confessed to being the culprit: "I wrote the bordereau". She published the interviews in September 1898, reporting his confession and writing a leader column accusing the French military of antisemitism and calling for a retrial for Dreyfus.

In France there was a passionate campaign by Dreyfus's supporters, including leading artists and intellectuals such as Émile Zola, following which he was given a second trial in 1899, but again declared guilty of treason despite the evidence of his innocence.

However, due to public opinion, Dreyfus was offered and accepted a pardon by President Émile Loubet in 1899 and released from prison; this was a compromise that saved face for the military's mistake. Had Dreyfus refused the pardon, he would have been returned to Devil's Island, a fate he could no longer emotionally cope with; so officially Dreyfus remained a traitor to France, and pointedly remarked upon his release:

For two years, until July 1906, he lived in a state of house-arrest with one of his sisters at Carpentras, and later at Cologny.

On 12 July 1906, Dreyfus was officially exonerated by a military commission. The day after his exoneration, he was readmitted into the army with a promotion to the rank of major (Chef d'Escadron). A week later, he was made Knight of the Legion of Honour, and subsequently assigned to command an artillery unit at Vincennes. On 15 October 1906, he was placed in command of another artillery unit at Saint-Denis.

Aftermath
While attending a ceremony relocating Zola's ashes to the Panthéon on 4 June 1908, Dreyfus was wounded in the arm by a gunshot from a right-wing journalist, who was trying to assassinate him. Grégori was acquitted by the Parisian court which accepted his defense that he had not meant to kill Dreyfus, meaning merely to graze him.

In 1937 Dreyfus's son Pierre published his father's memoirs based on his correspondence between 1899 and 1906. The memoirs were titled Souvenirs et Correspondance and translated into English by Betty Morgan.

Dreyfus started corresponding with the marquise Marie-Louise Arconati-Visconti in 1899 and began attending her Thursday (political) salons after his release.  They continued their correspondence until her death in 1923.

Modern aftermath
In October 2021 French president Emmanuel Macron opened a museum dedicated to the Dreyfus affair in Médan in the northwestern suburbs of Paris. He said that nothing could repair the humiliations and injustices Dreyfus had suffered, and "let us not aggravate it by forgetting, deepening or repeating them".

The reference to not repeating them follows attempts by the French far right to question Dreyfus's innocence. An army colonel was cashiered in 1994 for publishing an article suggesting that Dreyfus was guilty; far-right politician Jean-Marie Le Pen's lawyer responded that Dreyfus's exoneration was "contrary to all known jurisprudence". Éric Zemmour, a far-right political opponent of Macron, said repeatedly in 2021 that the truth about Dreyfus was not clear; his innocence was "not obvious".

Later life

World War I 
Dreyfus's prison sentence on Devil's Island had taken its toll on his health. He was granted retirement from the army in October 1907 at the age of 48. As a reserve officer, he re-entered the army as a major of artillery at the outbreak of World War I. Serving throughout the war, Dreyfus was promoted to the rank of lieutenant colonel.

By then in his mid-50s, Dreyfus served mostly behind the lines of the Western Front, in part as commander of an artillery supply column. However, he also performed front-line duties in 1917, notably at Verdun and on the Chemin des Dames. He was promoted to Officer of the Legion of Honour in November 1918.

Dreyfus's son Pierre also served throughout the entire war as an artillery officer, receiving the Croix de guerre.

Death 

Dreyfus died in Paris aged 75, on 12 July 1935, exactly 29 years after his exoneration. Two days later, his funeral cortège passed the Place de la Concorde through the ranks of troops assembled for the Bastille Day national holiday (14 July 1935). He was interred in the Cimetière du Montparnasse, Paris. The inscription on his tombstone is in French. It reads (translated to English):

A statue of Dreyfus holding his broken sword is located at Boulevard Raspail, nº116–118, at the exit of the Notre-Dame-des-Champs metro station. A duplicate statue stands in the courtyard of the Museum of Jewish Art and History in Paris.

Lucie Dreyfus, who had played a major role in the fight to exonerate her husband, was hidden in a convent in Valence during the German occupation. Their son, Pierre Léon Dreyfus (1891–1946), escaped to the United States in 1943. Their daughter, Jeanne Dreyfus Lévy (1893–1981), also survived, but granddaughter Madeleine Levy, arrested by French police in Toulouse, was deported and died of typhus in Auschwitz in January 1944, aged 25.

Legacy 

Dreyfus's grandchildren donated over three thousand documents to the Musée d'Art et d'Histoire du Judaïsme (Museum of Jewish Art and History), including personal letters, photographs of the trial, legal documents, writings by Dreyfus during his time in prison, personal family photographs, and his officer stripes that were ripped out as a symbol of treason. The museum created an online platform in 2006 dedicated to the Dreyfus Affair.

Military ranks

Honours and decorations

National honours

Decorations and medals

See also 
 Florence Earle Coates, a Philadelphia poet, wrote four poems about the Dreyfus affair: two entitled "Dreyfus", one published in 1898 and the other in 1899, "Picquart" (1902), and "Le Grand Salut" (1906).
 Jack Dreyfus, founder of the Dreyfus Funds and relative.
 Gérard Louis-Dreyfus, American businessman and distant relative.
 Julia Louis-Dreyfus, American actress and distant relative. 
 J'Accuse…!, influential 1898 open letter written by Émile Zola.
 Theodor Herzl, Austrian journalist who began the Zionist movement after seeing the antisemitism present in Dreyfus's trial.
 Gaston Moch, a defense supporter of Dreyfus.
 Charles Péguy, who wrote a defense of Dreyfus.
 George Whyte, an authority on the Dreyfus affair who has authored a large body of literary and stage works on Dreyfus and the Dreyfus affair.
 Julie Dreyfus, French actress and descendant.
 The Dreyfus Affair (film series), an 1899 series of short silent docudramas.
 The Prisoner of the Devil, a novel by Michael Hardwick which features Sherlock Holmes called in to solve the case.
 An Officer and a Spy, a novel written in  first person by Robert Harris, in the form of an account of the Dreyfus Affair as if written by Georges Picquart.
The Life of Emile Zola, a 1937 film starring Joseph Schildkraut as Dreyfus; best actor in a supportive role, Academy Awards.
I Accuse!, a 1958 film starring José Ferrer as Dreyfus.
 An Officer and a Spy, film by Roman Polanski (2019).

References

Bibliography 
 Lettres d'un innocent (Letters from an innocent man) (1898)
 Les lettres du capitaine Dreyfus à sa femme (Letters from capitaine Dreyfus to his wife) (1899), written at Devil's Island
 Cinq années de ma vie (5 years of my life) (1901),  New edition 2019, Comino. 
 Souvenirs et correspondence, posthumously in 1936
 Burns, Michael. Dreyfus: a family affair 1789–1945 (1991), Harpercollins.

External links 

 
 
 
 Dreyfus Rehabilitated 
 References to Alfred Dreyfus in European newspapers of the time - The European Library
 
 
 Alfred Dreyfus Personal Manuscripts and Letters
 Online platform on Musée d'art et d'histoire du judaïsme site
 
Actors and scenes in the drama of disgrace, A booklet with nearly one hundred photographs and documents from the arrest and trial of Dreyfus, from the National Library of Israel

1859 births
1935 deaths
Military personnel from Mulhouse
Alsatian Jews
French Army officers
French Army personnel who were court-martialed
École Polytechnique alumni
Devil's Island inmates
19th-century French Jews
French military personnel of World War I
French prisoners sentenced to life imprisonment
Jewish French history
Officiers of the Légion d'honneur
Overturned convictions in France
People associated with the Dreyfus affair
People convicted of treason against France
Prisoners sentenced to life imprisonment by France
Recipients of French presidential pardons
Burials at Montparnasse Cemetery
French Jewish military personnel